Incendiary Blonde is a 1945 American musical drama film biography of 1920s nightclub star Texas Guinan. Filmed in Technicolor by director George Marshall and loosely based on a true story, the picture stars actress Betty Hutton as Guinan. The film's title is a play on incendiary bombs being used in World War II.

The score was written by Robert Emmett Dolan, and was nominated for an Academy Award for "Best Music, Scoring of a Musical Picture."

Plot
A tomboy named Mary Louise "Texas" Guinan lands a job with a Wild West show after proving she can ride a bucking bronco. The rodeo's new owner is Romero "Bill" Kilgannon, who doubles Texas's pay after the attention she gets from saving a toddler's life from a runaway wagon at a show.

Tim Callahan comes along, looking for a job as the show's press agent by promising not to tell what he has found out, that Texas's "heroism" was a staged act, with a midget pretending to be the endangered child.

Texas sends money home to her impoverished family. Tim falls in love with her, but she prefers Bill, unaware that he is legally bound to an institutionalized wife. Tim ends up marrying Texas and promoting her new career on stage in New York.

Bill tries making movies in Hollywood, but things go badly. A gangster acquaintance, Joe Cadden, takes control of Nick the Greek's nightclub in New York and ends up making Texas his headliner there. Her fame grows, but a feud develops between Cadden and two other racketeers, the Vettori brothers, that leads to bloodshed and threats against Texas and Tim.

Bill saves her life, but is arrested and sentenced to jail. His own wife passes away, making him free to marry again, but Texas has discovered that she has an inoperable condition, and that she will die before Bill can get out of prison.

Cast

Cast notes
This was the final film for character actor Bud Jamison. Jamison, best known for his work with slapstick comedy team The Three Stooges (Disorder in the Court), died suddenly in September 1944. Jamison played the Head bartender, however, he did not receive credit for his work.

Production
The film was announced in 1942 and was originally to have co-starred Hutton and Alan Ladd.

Songs
"Ragtime Cowboy Joe" – music by Lewis F. Muir and Maurice Abrahams, lyrics by Grant Clarke
"What Do You Want to Make Those Eyes at Me For?" – music and lyrics by Joseph McCarthy, Howard Johnson and James V. Monaco
"It Had to Be You" – music by Isham Jones, lyrics by Gus Kahn
"Oh By Jingo!" – music by Albert Von Tilzer, lyrics by Lew Brown
"Row, Row, Row" – music by James V. Monaco, lyrics by William Jerome
"Darktown Strutters' Ball" – music and lyrics by Shelton Brooks, performed by Maurice Rocco
"Ida" – music and lyrics by Eddie Leonard
Source:

References

External links
  
 
 
 

1945 films
1945 drama films
1940s biographical drama films
1940s musical drama films
American biographical films
American musical drama films
Biographical films about entertainers
Films directed by George Marshall
Films scored by John Leipold
Films scored by Robert Emmett Dolan
Films set in the 1900s
Films set in the 1910s
Films set in the 1920s
Films set in the 1930s
Musical films based on actual events
Paramount Pictures films
1940s English-language films
1940s American films